1986 Empress's Cup Final was the 8th final of the Empress's Cup competition. The final was played at National Stadium in Tokyo on March 29, 1987. Shimizudaihachi SC won the championship.

Overview
Defending champion Shimizudaihachi SC won their 7th title, by defeating Yomiuri SC Beleza 1–0. Shimizudaihachi SC won the title for 7 years in a row.

Match details

See also
1986 Empress's Cup

References

Empress's Cup
1986 in Japanese women's football